New Shoreham is a town in Washington County, Rhode Island that is coextensive with Block Island. The town was named for Shoreham, Kent, in England. New Shoreham holds the distinction of southernmost town in both Washington County as well as all of the state of Rhode Island.

The students of New Shoreham in grades kindergarten through 12th grade attend Block Island School. Harbor Church was founded on October 23, 1765 and is located at 21 Water Street in New Shoreham.

Demographics 
At the 2000 census, there were 1,010 people, 472 households, and 250 families in the town. The population of New Shoreham was 1,410 at the 2020 census, making it the least-populous municipality in the state. 

The racial makeup of the town was 97.82% White, 0.59% African American, 0.79% Asian, 0.30% from other races, and 0.50% from two or more races. Hispanic or Latino of any race were 1.19% of the population.

Of the 472 households 21.4% had children under the age of 18 living with them, 43.4% were married couples living together, 7.2% had a female householder with no husband present, and 47.0% were non-families. 35.0% of households were one person and 12.9% were one person aged 65 or older. The average household size was 2.13 and the average family size was 2.82.

The age distribution was 18.3% under the age of 18, 4.7% from 18 to 24, 31.1% from 25 to 44, 28.6% from 45 to 64, and 17.3% 65 or older. The median age was 43 years. For every 100 females, there were 95.0 males. For every 100 females age 18 and over, there were 95.5 males.

The median household income was $44,779 and the median family income was $59,844. Males had a median income of $39,432 versus $28,125 for females. The per capita income for the town was $29,188. About 8.0% of families and 7.9% of the population were below the poverty line, including 10.2% of those under age 18 and 9.7% of those age 65 or over.

Notable people 
 Hayward Alker (1937–2007), professor of international relations
 William G. Angel (1790–1858), member of the U.S. House of Representatives
 Kenneth Bacon (1944–2009), journalist and former United States Department of Defense official
 Catharine Littlefield Greene (1755–1814), wife of Nathanael Greene
 William Paine Sheffield Sr. (1820–1907), politician
 John Underhill (1597–1672), soldier, captain, and early Massachusetts Bay Colony settler

References

 
Towns in Washington County, Rhode Island
Populated coastal places in Rhode Island
Towns in Rhode Island